Wheeler Island is a small island in Suisun Bay, California. It is part of Solano County; parts of it are included in Reclamation Districts 2127 (Simmons Wheeler) and 2130 (Honker Bay). An 1850 survey map of the San Francisco Bay area made by Cadwalader Ringgold, and an 1854 map by Henry Lange, show islands partially covering some of the current area of Wheeler Island, labeled "Davis Island" and "Warrington Island".

References

Islands of the San Francisco Bay Area
Islands of Northern California
Islands of Solano County, California
Islands of Suisun Bay